Ally Week is a national youth-led effort encouraging students to be allies with the LGBT (lesbian, gay, bisexual and transgender) members of their community in standing against bullying, harassment and name-calling. It takes place in K-12 schools and colleges. It was created by Joe Montana and other youth members of the Gay Lesbian & Straight Education Network GLSEN National JumpStart Student Leadership Team. It is done in the same spirit as Day of Silence to educate on anti-LGBT+ harassment issues. It is usually held in September or October, often coinciding with National Coming Out Day on October 11. October is also LGBT History Month. The event started in October 2005 and has grown since.

The goal of Ally Week is to diminish stereotypes and exclusion while highlighting that peer support for LGBT+ students is stronger than the students themselves may have thought existed. In a survey of 240 undergraduates regarding what peer support they felt LGBT+ students had, research found that their personal attitudes were significantly more positive than they thought their friends and fellow students held. Allies are identified as supporters but not necessarily members of a marginalized group.

During Ally Week people are encouraged to sign an ally pledge "taking a stand for a safe and harassment-free school for all students", and that they will not use anti-LGBT+ language and slurs, they will intervene if possible to stop bullying and harassment and support safer schools efforts. In 2008 the pledge cards were mistakenly used with kindergartners and opponents of gay marriage used this to correlate to the Proposition 8 battle in California, GLSEN stated they would review materials and ensure they were appropriate for all grade levels.

In 2010 the campaign encouraged awareness of the Safe Schools Improvement Act, similar to the recently signed "Dignity For All Students Act" (New York State) legislation to protect LGBT+ students from bullying.

The 2018 days for Ally Week is September 24–28.

See also
Youth voice
Youth service
Civic engagement
Suicide among LGBT youth

Notes

Sources
 Goldman, Linda, Coming out, coming in: nurturing the well-being and inclusion of gay youth in mainstream society, CRC Press, 2008, .
 Marcus, Eric, What If Someone I Know Is Gay?: Answers to Questions about What It Means to Be Gay and Lesbian, Simon and Schuster, 2007, .
 Meyer, Elizabeth J., Gender and Sexual Diversity in Schools: Volume 10 of Explorations of Educational Purpose, Springer, 2010, .
 Windmeyer, Shane L., The Advocate college guide for LGBT+ students, Alyson Books, 2006, 9781555838577.

External links
GLSEN website
Ally Week information

Youth-led organizations
LGBT youth
Anti-homophobia
homophobia
Transphobia
Biphobia
Lesbophobia
Discrimination against LGBT people
LGBT and education
Awareness weeks in the United States
September observances
October observances